Peter Curran (26 September 1924 – 15 June 1999) was a British television scriptwriter, film director, editor and producer.

He co-wrote four episodes of the Supermarionation television series Captain Scarlet and the Mysterons in the 1960s, forming a writing duo with David Williams: "White as Snow", "Point 783", "Seek and Destroy", "Noose of Ice" (wrongly credited to Tony Barwick) and "The Launching".

Curran's film credits include The Cherry Picker (1972; as screenwriter, producer, director and editor) and A Touch of the Sun (1979; screenwriter, director, editor). He also directed Male Bait (1971), Penelope Pulls it Off (1975) and Tell it like it is, Boys (1981). He served as editor for When Dinosaurs Ruled the Earth (1970).

External links

British film directors
British film editors
British film producers
British male screenwriters
British television writers
1924 births
1999 deaths
British male television writers
20th-century British screenwriters